Karolyn Smardz Frost is a Canadian historian who won the Governor General's Award for English-language non-fiction in 2007 for I’ve Got a Home in Glory Land: A Lost Tale of the Underground Railroad.

Smardz Frost is a historian, archaeologist, and professor of history. She has a bachelor's degree in Archaeology, a master's degree in Classical Studies and a PhD in Canadian History. She was one of the founders of Toronto's Archaeological Resource Centre which provides archaeological education to school children.

In 1985, Smardz Frost excavated the home of Thornton and Lucie Blackburn and later told their story in I’ve Got a Home in Glory Land: A Lost Tale of the Underground Railroad.

Works
 The underground railroad: next stop, Toronto! (2003) with Adrienne L Shadd and Afua Cooper
 I've got a home in glory land: a lost tale of the underground railroad (2007)

References

Governor General's Award-winning non-fiction writers
20th-century Canadian women writers
20th-century Canadian historians
Canadian archaeologists
Living people
Canadian women archaeologists
21st-century Canadian historians
Canadian women historians
Year of birth missing (living people)